The Red River Valley and Western Railroad  is a regional railroad operating in the US states of North Dakota and Minnesota. It began operations in 1987 in an era of railroad restructuring. 

Its  of track, originally acquired from the Burlington Northern Railroad, included:

 Wahpeton, North Dakota to Oakes, North Dakota
 Breckenridge, Minnesota to Brushvale, Minnesota
 Wahpeton, North Dakota to Casselton, North Dakota
 Chaffee Junction, North Dakota to Chaffee, North Dakota
 Casselton, North Dakota to Marion, North Dakota
 Oakes, North Dakota to Jamestown, North Dakota
 Horace, North Dakota to Independence, North Dakota
 La Moure, North Dakota to Edgeley, North Dakota
 Jamestown, North Dakota to Minnewaukan, North Dakota
 Pingree, North Dakota to Regan, North Dakota
 Carrington, North Dakota to Turtle Lake, North Dakota
 Oberon, North Dakota to Esmond, North Dakota

Shortly after it began operations, the Red River Valley and Western Railroad acquired a  rail line between Oakes, North Dakota and Hecla, South Dakota from the Dakota, Minnesota, and Eastern Railroad. It abandoned  of this rail line, beginning just south of Oakes, North Dakota, on September 7, 2001. 

Currently, the Red River Valley and Western Railroad owns and operates  of trackage which includes:

 Breckenridge, Minnesota to Brushvale, Minnesota
 Wahpeton, North Dakota to Oakes, North Dakota
 Wahpeton, North Dakota to Casselton, North Dakota
 Chaffee Junction, North Dakota to Chaffee, North Dakota
 Oakes, North Dakota to Jamestown, North Dakota
 Horace, North Dakota to Independence, North Dakota
 La Moure, North Dakota to Edgeley, North Dakota
 Jamestown, North Dakota to Maddock, North Dakota
 Pingree, North Dakota to Woodworth, North Dakota
 Additional trackage rights on the BNSF Railway and the Canadian Pacific Railway from Ransom Junction, North Dakota to Lucca, North Dakota, from Casselton, North Dakota to Jamestown, North Dakota, and from Breckenridge, Minnesota to Geneseo Junction, North Dakota

The Red River Valley and Western Railroad is affiliated with the Twin Cities and Western Railroad and the Minnesota Prairie Line. Andrew Thompson is the chief executive officer of all three railroads.

References
 AAR Railfan Club (2005), Railway Age Names Shortline, Regional Railroads of the Year.  Retrieved March 10, 2005.
 Red River Valley and Western Railroad (2005), Company Profile.  Retrieved March 10, 2005.

External links

 Red River Valley and Western official website

Minnesota railroads
North Dakota railroads
Regional railroads in the United States
Spin-offs of the Burlington Northern Railroad
Wahpeton, North Dakota